Riccardo De Sangro Fondi (22 December 1879 – April 1967) was an Italian sailor. He competed in the Star event at the 1936 Summer Olympics.

References

External links
 

1879 births
1967 deaths
Italian male sailors (sport)
Olympic sailors of Italy
Sailors at the 1936 Summer Olympics – Star
Sportspeople from Naples